David Will Hoskins (August 3, 1917 – April 2, 1970) was an American professional baseball player: a right-handed pitcher who appeared in 26 games for the Cleveland Indians of Major League Baseball during the 1953 season and 14 games during the 1954 campaign.

Negro leagues
Hoskins' professional career began in the Negro leagues with the Cincinnati Clowns in 1942.  He also played for the Chicago American Giants, Homestead Grays and Louisville Buckeyes through 1949.

Minor leagues
Hoskins was the first African American to play in the minor league Texas League, pitching for the Double-A Dallas Eagles in 1952. He faced much the same kind of hostility that Jackie Robinson did when he first broke into the majors five years earlier. Though players loved him, some fans cursed and taunted him, especially outside Dallas. At first, he was not allowed to play in Shreveport when the Eagles traveled there to play the Shreveport Sports.

Hoskins won 22 games for the Dallas Eagles in 1952 with a 2.12 earned run average. The pitcher made the All-Star team and also hit .328, an outstanding average for a pitcher. Six years later, he won 17 more games for the renamed Dallas Rangers in the same circuit.

Major League Baseball
Hoskins made the big-league Indians in 1953, going 9–3 with a 3.99 ERA. The following year, he had an ERA of 3.04, as the Indians won the American League pennant.

In  major league innings, Hoskins allowed 131 hits and 48 bases on balls. He struck out 64.

As a hitter, Hoskins was better than average, posting a .227 batting average (15-for-66) with 12 runs, 1 home run and 9 RBI. He was used as a pinch-hitter 16 times in his brief major league career. Defensively, he handled 40 total chances (9 putouts, 31 assists) without an error for a perfect 1.000 fielding percentage.

Death
Hoskins died in Flint, Michigan in 1970 at 52 years of age.

See also
 List of Negro league baseball players who played in Major League Baseball

References

External links
, or SABR Biography Project or Seamheads

1925 births
1970 deaths
African-American baseball players
Baseball players from Mississippi
Cleveland Indians players
Dayton Indians players
Dallas Eagles players
Dallas Rangers players
Grand Rapids Jets players
Homestead Grays players
Houston Buffs players
Indianapolis Indians players
Licoreros de Pampero players
Louisville Colonels (minor league) players
Major League Baseball pitchers
Montreal Royals players
Navegantes del Magallanes players
American expatriate baseball players in Venezuela
People from Greenwood, Mississippi
Petroleros de Poza Rica players
Rapiños de Occidente players
San Diego Padres (minor league) players
Spokane Indians players
American expatriate baseball players in Mexico
20th-century African-American sportspeople